Cynthia Coull (born 1965), is a Canadian former figure skater. Competing in pairs with Mark Rowsom, she became the 1986 World bronze medallist, 1986 Skate Canada International champion, and a three-time national champion (1985–1987). As a single skater, she is the 1985 NHK Trophy silver medallist and a three-time national medallist (silver in 1985, bronze in 1983 and 1984). She is the second of two women in Canadian history to be top 10 in the world in both ladies and pairs.

Results

Ladies' singles

Pairs with Rowsom

References
pairsonice

Navigation

Canadian female pair skaters
Canadian female single skaters
1965 births
Living people
Sportspeople from Longueuil
World Figure Skating Championships medalists